Ivan Vladimirovich Semyonov (born 9 July 1988) is a former Russian professional football player.

Club career
He played 3 seasons in the Russian Football National League for FC Nosta Novotroitsk and FC Torpedo Vladimir.

External links
 
 

1988 births
People from Kamensk-Shakhtinsky
Living people
Russian footballers
Association football midfielders
FC Tyumen players
FC Ufa players
FC Torpedo Vladimir players
FC Nosta Novotroitsk players
Sportspeople from Rostov Oblast